The 1905 Home Nations Championship was the twenty-third series of the rugby union Home Nations Championship. Six matches were played between 14 January and 18 March. It was contested by England, Ireland, Scotland and Wales.

Wales won the Championship and the Triple Crown for the fourth time. Nine months later the 1905 Wales team faced and beat the touring New Zealand team, in a match dubbed 'The Game of the Century'.

Table

Results

The matches

Wales vs. England

Wales: George Davies (Swansea), Teddy Morgan (London Welsh), Dan Rees (Swansea), Rhys Gabe (Llanelli), Willie Llewellyn (Newport) capt., Dicky Owen (Swansea), Dick Jones (Swansea), Jehoida Hodges (Newport), George Travers (Pill Harriers), Billy O'Neill (Cardiff), Arthur Harding (London Welsh), David Jones (Treherbert), Harry Vaughan Watkins (Llanelli), Will Joseph (Swansea), Charlie Pritchard (Newport)

England: SH Irvin (Devonport Albion), SF Coopper (Blackheath), John Raphael (Oxford Uni), FH Palmer (Richmond), EW Dillon (Blackheath) FC Hulme (Birkenhead Park), WV Butcher (Bristol), TA Gibson (Northern), WLY Rogers (Blackheath), BA Hill (Blackheath), JL Mathias (Bristol), Frank Stout (Richmond) capt., Charles Joseph Newbold (Blackheath), Vincent Cartwright (Blackheath), William Cave (Blackheath)

Scotland vs. Wales

Scotland: WT Forrest (Hawick), JE Crabbie (Edinburgh Acads), JL Forbes (Watsonians), LM MacLeod (Cambridge University), JS MacDonald (Edinburgh University), Patrick Munro (Oxford Uni), ED Simson (Edinburgh University), Anthony Little (Hawick), AG Cairns (Watsonians), WE Kyle (Hawick), WM Milne (Glasgow Acads), A Ross  (Royal HSFP), WP Scott (West of Scotland) capt., RS Stronach (Glasgow Acads), HN Fletcher (Edinburgh University)

Wales: George Davies (Swansea), Teddy Morgan (London Welsh), Dan Rees (Swansea), Rhys Gabe (Llanelli), Willie Llewellyn (Newport) capt., Dicky Owen (Swansea), Billy Trew (Swansea), Jehoida Hodges (Newport), George Travers (Pill Harriers), Billy O'Neill (Cardiff), Arthur Harding (London Welsh), David Jones (Treherbert), Harry Vaughan Watkins (Llanelli), Will Joseph (Swansea), Charlie Pritchard (Newport)

Ireland vs. England

Ireland: MF Landers (Cork Constitution), Basil Maclear (Cork County), JE Moffatt (Old Wesley), GAD Harvey (Wanderers), HB Thrift (Dublin University), TTH Robinson (Dublin University), ED Caddell (Dublin University), Jos Wallace (Wanderers), Henry Millar (Monkstown), CE Allen (Derry) capt., A Tedford (Malone), HG Wilson (Malone), HJ Knox (Dublin University), JJ Coffey (Lansdowne), GT Hamlet (Dublin University)

England: CF Stanger-Leathes (Northern), SF Coopper (Blackheath), HE Shewring (Bristol), T Simpson (Rockcliff), AT Brettargh (Liverpool OB) FC Hulme (Birkenhead Park), WV Butcher (Bristol), J Green (Skipton), WLY Rogers (Blackheath), G Vickery (Aberavon), JL Mathias (Bristol), Frank Stout (Richmond) capt., Charles Joseph Newbold (Blackheath), Vincent Cartwright (Blackheath), WM Grylls (Redruth)

Scotland vs. Ireland

Scotland: WT Forrest (Hawick), WT Ritchie (Cambridge University), Alec Boswell Timms (Cardiff), LM MacLeod (Cambridge University), Rh McCowat (Glasgow Acads), Patrick Munro (Oxford Uni), ED Simson (Edinburgh University), L West (Carlisle), AG Cairns (Watsonians), WE Kyle (Hawick), WM Milne (Glasgow Acads), A Ross  (Royal HSFP), WP Scott (West of Scotland) capt., RS Stronach (Glasgow Acads), MR Dickson (Edinburgh University)

Ireland: MF Landers (Cork Constitution), Basil Maclear (Cork County), JE Moffatt (Old Wesley), GAD Harvey (Wanderers), HB Thrift (Dublin University), TTH Robinson (Dublin University), ED Caddell (Dublin University), Jos Wallace (Wanderers), Henry Millar (Monkstown), CE Allen (Derry) capt., A Tedford (Malone), HG Wilson (Malone), HJ Knox (Dublin University), JJ Coffey (Lansdowne), GT Hamlet (Dublin University)

Wales vs. Ireland

Wales: George Davies (Swansea), Teddy Morgan (London Welsh), Gwyn Nicholls (Cardiff), Rhys Gabe (Llanelli), Willie Llewellyn (Newport) capt., Dicky Owen (Swansea), Anthony Windham Jones (Mountain Ash), Jehoida Hodges (Newport), George Travers (Pill Harriers), Billy O'Neill (Cardiff), Arthur Harding (London Welsh), David Jones (Treherbert), Harry Vaughan Watkins (Llanelli), Will Joseph (Swansea), Jack Williams (London Welsh)

Ireland: MF Landers (Cork Constitution), Basil Maclear (Cork County), JE Moffatt (Old Wesley), James Cecil Parke (Dublin University), HB Thrift (Dublin University), TTH Robinson (Dublin University), ED Caddell (Dublin University), Jos Wallace (Wanderers), Henry Millar (Monkstown), CE Allen (Derry) capt., A Tedford (Malone), HG Wilson (Malone), HJ Knox (Dublin University), JJ Coffey (Lansdowne), GT Hamlet (Dublin University)

England vs. Scotland

England: JT Taylor (West Hartlepool), SF Coopper (Blackheath), John Raphael (Oxford Uni), T Simpson (Rockcliff), AT Brettargh (Liverpool OB) AD Stoop (Oxford Uni), WV Butcher (Bristol), TA Gibson (Northern), Jumbo Milton (Camborne School of Mines), SH Osborne (Harlequins), JL Mathias (Bristol), Frank Stout (Richmond) capt., Charles Joseph Newbold (Blackheath), Vincent Cartwright (Blackheath), CEL Hammond (Harlequins)

Scotland: DG Schulze (London Scottish), WT Ritchie (Cambridge University), Alec Boswell Timms (Cardiff) capt., GAW Lamond (Bristol), T Elliot (Gala), Patrick Munro (Oxford Uni), ED Simson (Edinburgh University), L West (Carlisle), AG Cairns (Watsonians), WE Kyle (Hawick), JC MacCallum (Glasgow Acads), A Ross  (Royal HSFP), WP Scott (West of Scotland), RS Stronach (Glasgow Acads), HG Monteith (Cambridge University)

External links

Bibliography
 
 

1903-04
1904–05 in British rugby union
1904–05 in English rugby union
rugby union
rugby union
Home Nations Championship
Home Nations Championship
Home Nations Championship
1904–05 in Scottish rugby union